Datong (大同市) is a prefecture-level city in Shanxi province, China.

Datong (pinyin) or Tatung (Wade–Giles) may also refer to:

Great Unity, a classical Chinese concept for an utopian view of the world

Places

Counties
Datong County, Shanxi (大同县)
Datong Hui and Tu Autonomous County (大通回族土族自治县), Qinghai

Districts
Datong District, Daqing (大同区), Heilongjiang
Datong District, Huainan (大通区), Anhui
Datong District, Taipei (大同區), Taiwan

Towns
Datong, Yilan, Taiwan

Institutions and universities
Shanxi Datong University, in Datong, Shanxi
Tatung University, Taipei, Taiwan
Tatung Institute of Commerce and Technology, in Chiayi County, Taiwan
Utopia University, or Datong University, in Shanghai

Companies and sport clubs
Datong Coal Mining Group, state-owned coal mining enterprise of the PRC
Datong Coal Industry, a subsidiary and listed company of Datong Coal Mining Group
CRRC Datong, since 2003 'CNR Datong Electric Locomotive Co. Ltd' (DELC), in Datong, Shanxi
SAIC Datong, Chinese name of the automotive manufacturer Maxus
Tatung Company, Taiwanese electronics company
Tatung F.C., a Taiwanese football club owned by the company

Historical eras
Datong (大通, 527–529), Emperor Wu of Liang's 3rd reign period
Datong (大同, 535–546), Emperor Wu of Liang's 5th reign period
Datong (大統, 535–551), an era name used by Emperor Wen of Western Wei
Datong (大同, 947), an era name used by Emperor Taizong of Liao
Datong (大同, 1224–1233), an era name used by Puxian Wannu
Datong (大同, 1932–1934), an era name used by Puyi as Emperor of Manchukuo

Other uses
Datong (instrument), a Chinese music instrument
The Chinese Mayor, also called Datong, documentary film